20th Century Masters – The Millennium Collection: The Best of Waylon Jennings is a compilation album by American country music artist Waylon Jennings, released on MCA Nashville on May 9, 2000. It contains material from the singer's short tenure at MCA; this includes three tracks from Will the Wolf Survive (1986), two from Hangin' Tough (1987), another two from A Man Called Hoss (1987) and four from Full Circle (1988).

Track listing

Critical reception

20th Century Masters – The Millennium Collection: The Best of Waylon Jennings received three out of five stars from Steve Huey of AllMusic. In his review, Huey states that "the compilation demonstrates that Jennings did produce some quality work during his time with MCA" and is "a worthy addition to the collections of devoted fans."

Chart performance
20th Century Masters – The Millennium Collection: The Best of Waylon Jennings peaked at number 67 on the U.S. Billboard Top Country Albums chart.

References

External links
 Waylon Jennings' official website
 MCA Nashville official website

Jennings, Waylon
2000 greatest hits albums
MCA Records compilation albums
Waylon Jennings compilation albums